Badiotites is a genus of extinct ammonoid cephalopods belonging to the ceratitid family Badiotitidae. It was previously included with Lecanites in the Lecanitidae, a family formerly of the Clydonitaceae but reassigned by Tozer (1981) to the Danubitaceae. The Badiotitidae is included in the Ceratitaceae.

Badiotites is evolute, compressed, and discoidal, with sigmoidal ribs, an acutely rounded venter, and a goniatitic suture. It differs from Lecanites in that Lecanites is essentially smooth.

Badiotites comes from the Middle and Upper Triassic of   the Alps, Greece,  Hungary., Nepal, and British Columbia

References 

 Arkell et al., 1957, Mesozoic Ammonoidea; Treatise on Invertebrate Paleontology,  Part L, Ammonoidea. Geological Society of America & University of Kansas Press; R. C. Moore (ed)
 Badiotites -PaleoDB

Ceratitoidea
Ceratitida genera
Triassic ammonites
Ammonites of Europe